Flournoy is a census-designated place (CDP) in Tehama County, California. Flournoy is located in the south-western part of the county approximately halfway between the city of Corning and the town of Paskenta, located on Thomes Creek. The zip code is 96029. The 2010 United States census reported Flournoy's population was 101.

History
A post office was established at Flournoy in 1908, and remained in operation until 1966. The community has the name of George H. Flournoy, a local rancher and Civil War veteran.

Geography
According to the United States Census Bureau, the CDP covers an area of 5.8 square miles (15.0 km2), all of it land.

Climate
This region experiences warm (but not hot) and dry summers, with no average monthly temperatures above 71.6 °F.  According to the Köppen Climate Classification system, Flournoy has a warm-summer Mediterranean climate, abbreviated "Csb" on climate maps.

Demographics

The 2010 United States Census reported that Flournoy had a population of 101. The population density was 17.4 people per square mile (6.7/km2). The racial makeup of Flournoy was 90 (89.1%) White, 0 (0.0%) African American, 1 (1.0%) Native American, 3 (3.0%) Asian, 2 (2.0%) Pacific Islander, 4 (4.0%) from other races, and 1 (1.0%) from two or more races.  Hispanic or Latino of any race were 9 persons (8.9%).

The Census reported that 101 people (100% of the population) lived in households, 0 (0%) lived in non-institutionalized group quarters, and 0 (0%) were institutionalized.

There were 43 households, out of which 11 (25.6%) had children under the age of 18 living in them, 26 (60.5%) were opposite-sex married couples living together, 5 (11.6%) had a female householder with no husband present, 1 (2.3%) had a male householder with no wife present.  There were 1 (2.3%) unmarried opposite-sex partnerships, and 0 (0%) same-sex married couples or partnerships. 10 households (23.3%) were made up of individuals, and 2 (4.7%) had someone living alone who was 65 years of age or older. The average household size was 2.35.  There were 32 families (74.4% of all households); the average family size was 2.78.

The population was spread out, with 19 people (18.8%) under the age of 18, 8 people (7.9%) aged 18 to 24, 15 people (14.9%) aged 25 to 44, 39 people (38.6%) aged 45 to 64, and 20 people (19.8%) who were 65 years of age or older.  The median age was 48.9 years. For every 100 females, there were 90.6 males.  For every 100 females age 18 and over, there were 95.2 males.

There were 51 housing units at an average density of 8.8 per square mile (3.4/km2), of which 37 (86.0%) were owner-occupied, and 6 (14.0%) were occupied by renters. The homeowner vacancy rate was 0%; the rental vacancy rate was 0%.  93 people (92.1% of the population) lived in owner-occupied housing units and 8 people (7.9%) lived in rental housing units.

References

External links
Flournoy Elementary School serves grades K-8

Census-designated places in Tehama County, California
Census-designated places in California